USS Kearsarge (BB-5), was a pre-dreadnought battleship of the United States Navy and lead ship of her class of battleships. She was named after the sloop-of-war , famous for sinking the CSS Alabama, and was the only United States Navy battleship not named after a state.

Her keel was laid down by the Newport News Shipbuilding Company of Virginia, on 30 June 1896. She was launched on 24 March 1898, sponsored by Mrs. Elizabeth Winslow (née Maynard), the wife of Rear Admiral Herbert Winslow, and commissioned on 20 February 1900.

Between 1903 and 1907 Kearsarge served in the North Atlantic Fleet, and from 1907 to 1909 she sailed as part of the Great White Fleet. In 1909 she was decommissioned for modernization, which was finished in 1911. In 1915 she served in the Atlantic, and between 1916 and 1919 she served as a training ship. She was converted into a crane ship in 1920, renamed Crane Ship No. 1 in 1941, and sold for scrap in 1955.

Design 

The Kearsarge-class battleships were designed to be used for coastal defense. Kearsarge was manned by 40 officers and 514 enlisted men, a total of 554 crew.

[[File:Kearsarge - det1994013792 (crop).jpg|left|thumb|alt=A smaller turret on top of a bigger turret.|Kearsarges double turret on 8 April 1900]]
Kearsarge had two double turrets, with two /35 caliber guns and two /40 caliber guns each, stacked in two levels. The guns and turret armor were designed by the Bureau of Ordnance, while the turret itself was designed by the Bureau of Construction and Repair. This caused the guns to be mounted far back in the turret, making the ports very large. Admiral William Sims claimed that as a result, a shell fired into the port could reach the magazines below, disabling the guns. In addition to these guns, Kearsarge carried fourteen /40 caliber guns, twenty 6-pounder guns, eight 1-pounder guns, four  machine guns, and four  torpedo tubes. Kearsarge had a very low freeboard, which resulted in her guns becoming unusable in bad weather.

The armor was made of harveyized steel.

Kearsarge carried 16 smaller boats. A  steam cutter, with a capacity of 60 men, together with a  steam cutter, were used for general carrying from and to port, and could tow the other boats if needed. Two 33-foot launches, each capable of carrying 64 men, were the "working boats". There were ten  boats: four cutters, each with a capacity of 45 men, the Admiral's barge, two whaleboats (which served as lifeboats), and the Captain's gig. Four smaller boats completed Kearsarges small fleet: two  dinghies and two  catamarans.

 Construction 

Kearsarge was authorized on 2 March 1895, the contract for her construction was awarded on 2 January 1896, and the keel of the vessel was laid down on 30 June 1896 by Newport News Shipbuilding & Dry Dock Company in Virginia. The total cost was US$5,043,591.68. She was soon named after the American Civil War sloop-of-war , and was the first ship of the United States Navy to be named by act of Congress. She was the only US battleship not named after a state. She was christened on 24 March 1898 (the same day as her sister ship, Kentucky) by Mrs. Elizabeth Winslow (née Maynard), the wife of Captain Herbert Winslow, daughter-in-law of Captain John Ancrum Winslow, the commander of the original Kearsarge. She was commissioned on 20 February 1900, under the command of Captain William M. Folger.

 Service history 
 Early career 
As flagship of the North Atlantic Squadron, Kearsarge sailed along the Atlantic seaboard and the Caribbean Sea. In May 1901 Captain Bowman H. McCalla assumed command of Kearsarge, although by May 1902 the ship was being commanded by Captain Joseph Newton Hemphill. Reassigned as flagship of the European Squadron, she sailed from Sandy Hook on 3 June 1903, on her way to Kiel, Germany. She was visited by Emperor Wilhelm II of Germany on 25 June, and by the Prince of Wales – who would later become King George V of the United Kingdom – on 13 July.

Kearsarge returned to Bar Harbor, Maine, on 26 July, and resumed her position as flagship. On 1 December the ship sailed from New York for Guantánamo Bay, Cuba, where she was present as the United States took formal possession of the Guantanamo Naval Reservation on 10 December. On 26 March 1904 Captain Raymond P. Rodgers assumed command of the ship. Following maneuvers in the Caribbean Sea, Kearsarge left with the North Atlantic Squadron for Lisbon, Portugal, where she met King Carlos I of Portugal on 11 June 1904. Independence Day was celebrated in Phaleron Bay, Greece, with King George I of Greece and his son and daughter-in-law, Prince Andrew of Greece and Denmark and Princess Alice of Battenberg. The squadron visited Corfu, Trieste, and Fiume before returning to Newport, Rhode Island, on 29 August 1904.

On 31 March 1905,  replaced Kearsarge as flagship of the North Atlantic Fleet, although she remained with the fleet. Captain Herbert Winslow took command of the ship during December. On 13 April 1906, while participating in an exercise off Cape Cruz, Cuba, the gunpowder in a 13-inch gun ignited accidentally, killing two officers and eight men.

 Great White Fleet 

Attached to the Fourth Division of the Second Squadron, and under command of Captain Hamilton Hutchins, she sailed on 16 December 1907 with the Great White Fleet. The fleet left from Hampton Roads, passed by Trinidad and Rio de Janeiro, and then passed through the Straits of Magellan. From there she passed by the west coast of South America, visiting Punta Arenas and Valparaíso, Chile, Callao, Peru, and Magdalena Bay, Mexico. The fleet reached San Diego on 14 April 1908 and moved on to San Francisco on 6 May. Two months later the warships sailed for Honolulu, Hawaii, and from there to Auckland, New Zealand, arriving 9 August. The fleet made Sydney, Australia, on 20 August, and after a week sailed for Melbourne.

Kearsarge departed Albany, Western Australia, on 18 September for ports in the Philippine Islands, Japan, China, and Ceylon before transiting the Suez Canal. The fleet split at Port Said, with Kearsarge leaving on 10 January 1909 for Malta, and arriving in Algiers on 24 January, before reforming with the fleet at Gibraltar on 1 February. She returned to Hampton Roads on 22 February, and was inspected by U.S. President Theodore Roosevelt.

 World War I 

As with most of the Great White Fleet ships, Kearsarge was modernized on her return. She was decommissioned at the Philadelphia Naval Shipyard on 4 September 1909, and the modernization was completed in 1911, at a cost of US$675,000. The ship received cage masts, new water-tube boilers, and another four 5-inch guns. The 1-pounder guns were removed, as were sixteen of the 6-pounders. She was recommissioned on 23 June 1915, and operated along the Atlantic coast. On 17 September she left Philadelphia to land a detachment of US Marines at Veracruz, Mexico, remaining there from 28 September 1915 to 5 January 1916. She then carried the Marines to New Orleans, Louisiana, before joining the Atlantic Reserve Fleet at Philadelphia on 4 February. Until the United States joined World War I, she trained naval militia from Massachusetts and Maine. During the war she was used to train Armed Guard crews and naval engineers during cruises along the Atlantic seaboard.

 Inter-war period 

Between 29 May and 29 August 1919, Kearsarge trained United States Naval Academy midshipmen in the Caribbean. Kearsarge sailed from Annapolis, Maryland to the Philadelphia Navy Yard, where she decommissioned on either 10 May or 18 May 1920.

Kearsarge was converted into a crane ship, and was given hull classification symbol IX-16 on 17 July 1920, but it was changed to AB-1''' on 5 August. Her turrets, superstructure, and armor were removed, and were replaced by a large revolving crane with a lifting capacity of 250 tons (230 tonnes), as well as  blisters, which improved her stability.

 World War II 

One of her last projects was performing heavy lifts during the reassembly of another crane vessel, YD-171 (ex-Schwimmkran nr. 1'') on Terminal Island. In 1948 she left the West Coast for the Boston Naval Shipyard. On 22 June 1955 her name was struck from the Naval Vessel Register, and she was sold for scrap on 9 August.

Footnotes

Notes

Citations

Bibliography

Books

Newspapers

Online resources

Further reading

External links 

 Naval Historical Center USS Kearsarge (Battleship # 5), 1900–1955. Later Crane Ship # 1 (AB-1).
 MaritimeQuest USS Kearsarge BB-5 Photo Gallery
 
 Rough Log Book of the U.S.S. Kearsarge, 1901 MS 314 held by Special Collections & Archives, Nimitz Library at the United States Naval Academy

 

Kearsarge-class battleships
1898 ships
Banana Wars ships of the United States
World War I battleships of the United States
Crane ships of the United States Navy
World War II auxiliary ships of the United States
Ships built in Newport News, Virginia
Crane vessels
Floating cranes
Individual cranes (machines)